The Craft of Opportunity Program (COOP) was a Royal Australian Navy (RAN) acquisition program intended to supplement the navy's mine warfare capability with civilian vessels that could be quickly converted into minesweepers. Vessels acquired under COOP were not commissioned into the RAN, and instead operated with the prefix "MSA" (Minesweeper Auxiliary).

Acquisitions
COOP was initiated in 1985, to cover the gap in mine warfare capability caused by the decommissioning of the Ton-class minesweepers and delays in building their replacements, the Bay-class minehunting catamarans. In order to equip the auxiliary vessels, the RAN acquired several Klein Type 590 towed sidescan sonar arrays, along with Mini-Dyad magnetic influence sweep arrays, AMASS influence sweep arrays, and mechanical minesweeping gear. When the Bays were found to be poorly suited for minehunting work, the COOP vessels were kept on until the Huon class entered service, with some retained even later as a supplementary force.

Another three trawlers, Salvatore V, Waverider, and Carole S, were chartered. Also acquired under the program were three drone ships, which could be operated from the auxiliary minesweepers. Although not directly a part of COOP, the Defence Maritime Services training ship Seahorse Horizon can also be fitted out as an auxiliary minesweeper.

End of the program

By 2012, most of the vessels have been sold or returned to their owners. Bandicoot and Wallaroo have not been operated as minesweepers since 2010, but were retained until 2014 to provide berthing support for nuclear-powered warships. The drones have been non-operational since 2007, and are due to be replaced by 2013.

Citations

References

Royal Australian Navy
Mine warfare vessels of the Royal Australian Navy